Elsa Faucillon (born 6 August 1981) is a French politician. She is a member of the National Assembly representing Hauts-de-Seine's 1st constituency.

References

1981 births
Living people
People from Amiens
Deputies of the 15th National Assembly of the French Fifth Republic
French Communist Party politicians
Women members of the National Assembly (France)
Pantheon-Sorbonne University alumni
Politicians from Île-de-France
21st-century French women
Members of Parliament for Hauts-de-Seine